The 2004 Republican National Convention took place from August 30 to September 2, 2004 at Madison Square Garden in New York City, New York. The convention is one of a series of historic quadrennial meetings at which the Republican candidates for president and vice president, and party platform are formally adopted. Attendance included 2,509 delegates and 2,344 alternate delegates from the states, territories and the District of Columbia. The convention marked the formal end of the active primary election season.  , it is the most recent major-party nominating convention to be held in New York City.

The theme of the convention was "Fulfilling America's Promise by Building a Safer World and a More Hopeful America." Defining moments of the 2004 Republican National Convention include a featured keynote address by Zell Miller and the confirmation of the nomination of President George W. Bush and Vice President Dick Cheney for reelection. Bush and Cheney faced the Democratic Party's ticket of John Kerry and John Edwards in the 2004 presidential election and won.

Platform
Apart from nominating a candidate for president and vice president, the 2004 Republican National Convention was also charged with crafting an official party platform and political agenda for the next four years. At the helm of the Platform Committee was United States Senator and Senate Majority Leader Bill Frist of Tennessee, Congresswoman Melissa Hart of Pennsylvania and Colorado Governor Bill Owens. The committee worked with the Bush campaign to develop the draft platform.

The platform adopted by the 2004 Republican National Convention was the longest in the party's history compared to the mere 1,000-word platform adopted at the first convention in 1856. At 48,000 words, it was twice the length of the one adopted at the 2004 Democratic National Convention which was only 19,500 words.

Venue

The choice of Madison Square Garden on January 31, 2003 by all 165 members of the Republican National Committee as the venue for the 2004 Republican National Convention meant that New York City would host a major Republican nominating convention for the first time in its history. On July 19, control of Madison Square Garden was officially handed over to the Republican Party under the administration of Chief Executive Officer of the Convention, Bill Harris. Mayor Michael Bloomberg thanked the party for their choice, for which he had vigorously lobbied, noting it as a significant display of support for the city and an economic boom.

As of the 2020 presidential election, 2004 is the last time that either major party held their convention in a state that was not considered to be a swing state (the Democrats held their 2004 convention in Boston, Massachusetts).

Security

Like the 2004 Democratic National Convention in Boston, Massachusetts, the Department of Homeland Security (DHS) officially declared the 2004 Republican National Convention a National Special Security Event (NSSE). As such, the United States Secret Service was charged with employing and coordinating all federal and local agencies including the various bureaus of DHS, the FBI, and the NYPD to secure the venue from terrorist attacks. Expected security expenditures reached $70 million, $50 million of which was funded by the federal government.

The city employed an active beat of 10,000 police officers deployed as Hercules teams—uniformed in full riot gear and body armor, and equipped with submachine guns and rifles. Commuter and Amtrak trains entering and exiting Penn Station were scoured by bomb-sniffing dogs as uniformed police officers were attached to buses carrying delegates. All employees of buildings surrounding Madison Square Garden were subjected to thorough screening and background checks.

The NYPD infiltrated and compiled dossiers on protest groups (most of whom were doing nothing illegal), leading to over 1,800 arrests and subsequent fingerprinting.

Timing
The convention took place in New York City a week before the third anniversary of September 11. The attacks were a primary theme of the convention, from the choice of speakers to repeated invocations of the attacks.
At the convention, there was a performance of "Amazing Grace" by Daniel Rodriguez, a tribute to those killed on September 11. Relatives of three of the victims spoke and talked about how September 11 brought the country together. Also contributing musically were Brooks & Dunn, Sara Evans, Lee Ann Womack, Darryl Worley.

Speakers
Early in the summer leading up to the 2004 Republican National Convention, Republican National Committee Chairman Ed Gillespie announced the first slate of convention speakers. He added, "It is an honor to announce the addition of these outstanding Americans to the 2004 Republican National Convention program. For the past three and a half years, President Bush has led with strength and compassion and these speakers reflect that." Chief Executive Officer of the Convention Bill Harris commented, "These speakers have seen President Bush's strong, steady leadership and each will attest to his character from a unique perspective. Their vast experience and various points of view are a testament to the depth and breadth of the support for the Republican ticket in 2004."

Zell Miller
Considered to be one of the most interesting choices for speakers at the convention was a keynote address by Georgia Senator Zell Miller, a conservative Democrat. Miller had consistently voted with Republicans. In an editorial in The Wall Street Journal, Miller cited that the reason for his defection was that, "I barely recognize my party anymore." He continued, "Today, it's the Democratic Party that has mastered the art of division and diversion. To run for president as a Democrat these days you have to go from interest group to interest group, cap in hand, asking for the support of liberal kingmakers." He finished by saying, "I still believe in hope and opportunity and, when it comes right down to it, Mr. Bush is the man who represents hope and opportunity."

His keynote address was a visceral smite to Democrats and an excoriating attack on John Kerry, blaming him for the divisions in America. Notably, he mocked Kerry's call for strength in the armed forces by noting several important military projects that Kerry had opposed, saying that Kerry wanted "forces armed with what - spitballs?" Including Senator Edward Kennedy of Massachusetts, he claimed "no pair has been more wrong, more loudly, more often, than the two senators from Massachusetts: Ted Kennedy and John Kerry."

In his speech, Miller also heaped his praise for 1940 Republican Presidential nominee Wendell Willkie for supporting President Roosevelt's establishment of a military draft, raising concerns about the intentions of President Bush in this area.

Zell Miller also delivered the keynote address on behalf of Bill Clinton in 1992 at Madison Square Garden. He remained a Democrat in the Senate until leaving in 2005 (he was not running for reelection). However, after this address, his affiliation with the national Democratic Party was unquestionably over.

Nancy Reagan's absence

Nancy Reagan's spokesperson announced that the former First Lady fully supported President Bush for the general election. The spokesperson added that while the former First Lady and her children would be absent from the 2004 Republican National Convention, President Reagan's son with Jane Wyman, Michael Reagan, had accepted an invitation to address the delegates. Nancy Reagan appeared in the filmed tribute he introduced. He dedicated the film to everyone who helped make his father president of the United States.

During the convention, delegates paid tribute to Reagan in different ways. Many of the speakers from California and Illinois, including House Speaker Dennis Hastert, mentioned Reagan in their speeches and compared Reagan to Bush. Those from Illinois, including Hastert, compared Bush to both Reagan and Abraham Lincoln, another native son of their state.

Chairpeople
Dennis Hastert, Permanent Chairman and Speaker of the House of Representatives
Linda Lingle, Temporary Chairman and Governor of Hawaii
Several deputy co-chairs were named as a ceremonial honor

Monday, August 30, 2004

Principal speakers
Michael Bloomberg, Mayor of New York City
Rudy Giuliani, Former Mayor of New York City
John McCain, United States Senator from Arizona

Featured speakers
George Allen, United States Senator from Virginia
Lindsey Graham, United States Senator from South Carolina
Angie Harmon, Actress
Bernard Kerik, Former Commissioner of the New York Police Department
Elisabeth Hasselbeck, Television host
Edward I. Koch, Former Democratic Mayor of New York City
Marc Racicot, Former Governor of Montana
Jason Sehorn, Athlete
Ron Silver, Actor
Bob Taft, Governor of Ohio
Ann Wagner, Co-chair, Republican National Committee

Quotations

Tuesday, August 31, 2004

Principal speakers
Laura Bush, First Lady of the United States
Rod Paige, United States Secretary of Education
Arnold Schwarzenegger, Governor of California

Featured speakers
Sam Brownback, United States Senator from Kansas
George P. Bush, son of Governor of Florida Jeb Bush, nephew of President George W. Bush
Norm Coleman, United States Senator from Minnesota
Elizabeth Dole, United States Senator from North Carolina
Bill Frist, United States Senator from Tennessee and Senate Majority Leader
Erika Harold, Miss America 2003
Anne Northup, United States Representative from Kentucky
Michael S. Steele, Lieutenant Governor of Maryland

Quotations

Wednesday, September 1, 2004

Balloting
President Bush was nominated at the end of a "rolling roll call" that had started the day before, when Pennsylvania's delegation cast the deciding votes.

Principal speakers
Lynne Cheney, Second Lady of the United States
Dick Cheney, Vice President of the United States
Zell Miller, Keynote Speaker and Democratic United States Senator from Georgia

Featured speakers
Elaine Chao, United States Secretary of Labor
Kerry Healey, Lieutenant Governor of Massachusetts
Linda Lingle, Governor of Hawaii
Mitch McConnell United States Senator from Kentucky
Rob Portman, United States Representative from Ohio
Michael Reagan, son of President Ronald Reagan
Mitt Romney, Governor of Massachusetts
Paul Ryan, United States Representative from Wisconsin
Brian Sandoval, Attorney General of Nevada
Rick Santorum, United States Senator from Pennsylvania

Quotations

Thursday, September 2, 2004

Balloting
Vice President Dick Cheney was nominated by voice vote for reelection.

Principal speakers
George Pataki, Governor of New York
George W. Bush, President of the United States

Featured speakers
Edward Egan, Roman Catholic Cardinal Archbishop of New York
Tommy Franks, Former Commander of the United States Central Command
Dorothy Hamill, Athlete
Michael L. Williams, Assistant Secretary of Convention, Texas Railroad Commissioner 
Mel Martinez, Former United States Secretary of Housing and Urban Development- Elected to the U.S. Senate in Florida in 2004.
Lynn Swann, Athlete

Quotations

Aftermath
According to Rasmussen weekly tracking polls, Bush led Kerry by 0.3% on the poll released August 26. On September 2, Bush's lead had increased to 2.5%. On September 9, the lead had decreased to 1.3%. Bush would maintain his leads throughout the fall.

Protests

Protest activity included marches, rallies, performances, demonstrations, exhibits, and acts of civil disobedience in New York City to protest the 2004 Republican National Convention and the nomination of President George W. Bush for the 2004 U.S. presidential election, as well as a much smaller number of people who marched to support Bush at the convention.

On May 17, 2006 Amy Goodman, host of Democracy Now! reported on the FBI launch of a criminal civil rights investigation of NYPD after Desert storm veteran Dennis Kyne went to trial and had all charges dropped due to video evidence showing the police falsified reports and sworn testimony.

See also
List of Republican National Conventions
2004 Republican National Convention protest activity
2004 Republican Party presidential primaries
George W. Bush 2004 presidential campaign
2004 Democratic National Convention
United States presidential nominating convention
2004 United States presidential election

References

External links

George W. Bush's nomination acceptance speech for President at RNC (transcript) at The American Presidency Project
Republican Party platform of 2004 at The American Presidency Project
Full text of selected speeches (archived)
Photos and Videos From Inside New York's Pier 57 Detention Center (archived)
Complete text and audio of Zell Miller's RNC Address AmericanRhetoric.com
List of members from various state delegations to convention
Intelligence documents compiled by NYPD about the protests
Video of Bush nomination acceptance speech for President at RNC (via YouTube)
Audio of Bush nomination acceptance speech for President at RNC
Video of Cheney nomination acceptance speech for Vice President at RNC (via YouTube)
Audio of Cheney nomination acceptance speech for Vice President at RNC
Transcript of Cheney nomination acceptance speech for Vice President at RNC

 
Republican National Convention 2004
2004 politics in New York (state)
2004 conferences
August 2004 events in the United States
September 2004 events in the United States